Watershed is the ninth full-length studio album by the Swedish progressive metal band Opeth. Released by Roadrunner Records, Watershed is the first studio album by Opeth to feature guitarist Fredrik Åkesson and drummer Martin Axenrot, who replaced longtime guitarist Peter Lindgren and drummer Martin Lopez. The artwork for the album was made by Travis Smith (who has created the artwork for eight previous Opeth releases) in collaboration with Mikael Åkerfeldt. It is the band's last studio album to contain death growls or any death metal elements to date.

Overview
On opening track "Coil", Mikael Åkerfeldt duets with Nathalie Lorichs, who was dating drummer Martin Axenrot at the time. The band has revealed that they were initially going to start the album with what eventually became the second track, "Heir Apparent"; however, they preferred "Coil" as an introductory track for its contrast to "Heir Apparent".

Åkerfeldt was inspired to write the single "Burden" while listening to the Scorpions song "Living And Dying" during a stay in Turkey.

Reception

The album was met with universal acclaim according to Metacritic, receiving a metascore of 82/100 based on 10 critics.

On Metal Hammer's Critic's Choice Top 50, Watershed was named as the second-best album of 2008 (behind only Metallica's Death Magnetic).
In the January/February 2009 issue of Metal Edge, Watershed was voted the number 1 album of 2008.

In a fan club interview dated to November 2008, a few months after the album's release, former guitarist Peter Lindgren praised the album, noting that "it was a weird feeling to get a new Opeth CD...that he hadn't been a part of", and that he "had trouble following the new songs at first", but called it "damn good".

Release history
Watershed was released as a standard edition, a 180 gram vinyl edition, and a special edition. The special edition includes three bonus tracks, a bonus DVD with a 5.1 surround sound mix of the entire album (not including bonus tracks), video content featuring rehearsals, and studio footage, as well as expanded artwork. The vinyl release comes in gatefold packaging and contains the album on two LPs, as well as a CD copy of the album (both including the bonus track "Derelict Herds") and a poster.

"Mellotron Heart" was included on a separate disc with a limited number of copies of the album. It is an alternate recording of the song "Porcelain Heart", performed on mellotron and mini-Moog synthesizers by Åkerfeldt himself. The cover for the CD is the standard album artwork with the figure and writing desk replaced by a mellotron. The track is also available as a free digital download exclusively for those who pre-ordered the album from The End Records, and to people who insert the CD into their computer via Opendisc.

Track listing

Personnel

Opeth
 Mikael Åkerfeldt – vocals, guitar
 Fredrik Åkesson – guitar
 Per Wiberg – keyboards, synthesizer
 Martín Méndez – bass guitar
 Martin Axenrot – drums

Additional musicians
 Nathalie Lorichs – female vocals 
 Lisa Almberg – English horn, oboe
 Christoffer Wadensten – flute
 Karin Svensson – violin
 Andreas Tengberg – cello

Production and design
 Mikael Åkerfeldt – production, artwork
 Jens Bogren – production, recording, mixing, mastering
 Mikhail Korge – recording (additional)
 David Castillo – engineering (additional)
 Johan Örnborg – engineering (additional)
 Travis Smith – artwork

Usage in media
The song "Heir Apparent" was featured as a downloadable content in the video game Rock Band 4.
The song "The Lotus Eater" was featured in the 2011 video game Saints Row: The Third.

Chart positions

Weekly

Monthly

References 

2008 albums
Albums produced by Jens Bogren
Albums with cover art by Travis Smith (artist)
Opeth albums
Roadrunner Records albums